Albert Van Heymbeek (born 1900, date of death unknown) was a Belgian diver. He competed in two events at the 1924 Summer Olympics.

References

External links
 

1900 births
Year of death missing
Belgian male divers
Olympic divers of Belgium
Divers at the 1924 Summer Olympics
Place of birth missing
20th-century Belgian people